Gene Lakusiak (June 1, 1942 – June 29, 2020) was a Canadian football player who played for the Ottawa Rough Riders and Winnipeg Blue Bombers. He played college football at the University of Tulsa.

References

1942 births
2020 deaths
American football halfbacks
Canadian football running backs
Players of Canadian football from Manitoba
Tulsa Golden Hurricane football players
Ottawa Rough Riders players
Winnipeg Blue Bombers players